GJ 625 (AC 54 1646-56) is a small red dwarf star with an exoplanetary companion in the northern constellation of Draco. The system is located at a distance of 21.1 light-years from the Sun based on parallax, but is drifting closer with a radial velocity of −13 km/s. It is too faint to be visible to the naked eye, having an apparent visual magnitude of 10.13 and an absolute magnitude of 11.06.

This is an M-type main-sequence star with a stellar classification of M1.5V. It is spinning slowly with a rotation period of roughly 78 days, and has a low magnetic activity level. The star has about a quarter of the mass and size of the Sun, and the metal content is 40% the abundances in the Sun's atmosphere. It is radiating just 1.5% of the luminosity of the Sun from its photosphere at an effective temperature of 3,557 K.

Planetary system
On May 18, 2017, a planet was detected orbiting AC 54 1646-56 by the HARPS-N telescope. The planet, AC 54 1646-56b or (GJ 625b) orbits on the inner edge of the optimistic circumstellar habitable zone of its star, and may support liquid water. Since the star is considered quiescent (having a low X-ray emission and flare rate), the radio emission from the system may be auroral in nature and coming from a short-period planet. Further observations will be needed to confirm this.

References

M-type main-sequence stars
Planetary systems with one confirmed planet
Draco (constellation)
0625
080459